The Redfern-Eveleigh-Darlington or RED project (also known as the Redfern-Waterloo Partnership Program) was instigated by the state government of New South Wales to redevelop the run-down housing and railway yards in the suburbs of Redfern, Eveleigh and Darlington to the South-West of Sydney central business district to ease the pressure of Sydney's growing population by housing more people near the city centre. This centre can also be referred to as the Central City precinct.

The RED project was officially wound up in January 2005 and replaced with the Redfern-Waterloo Authority. The Authority has a wider remit than the former RED project, including renewing local infrastructure and improving co-ordination of social and community services.

External links
Redfern-Waterloo Authority: NSW Government Authority
REDWatch: Residents Association

2005 disestablishments in Australia
Organisations based in Sydney